Afanasovo is a rural locality (a village) in Kovarditskoye Rural Settlement, Muromsky District, Vladimir Oblast, Russia. The population was 123 as of 2010.

Geography 
Afanasovo is located on the Unorka River, 17 km northwest of Murom (the district's administrative centre) by road. Zimenki is the nearest rural locality.

References 

Rural localities in Muromsky District
Muromsky Uyezd